Kuwait competed in the Olympic Games for the first time at the 1968 Summer Olympics in Mexico City, Mexico.

The Kuwaiti Olympic team did not win any medals in these Games.

Athletics 

Men
Track & road events

Marathon 
Mraljeb Ayed Mansoor: DNF
Saoud Obaid Daifallah: DNF

References
Official Olympic Reports

Nations at the 1968 Summer Olympics
1968
Summer Olympics